Martin Shields  (born April 28, 1948) is a Canadian politician, who was elected to represent the riding of  Bow River in the House of Commons of Canada in the 2015 Canadian federal election.

Prior to his election, he served as the mayor of Brooks, Alberta since 2007. He was born in 1948 in Lethbridge, Alberta. Prior to his career in politics, Shields served as a teacher and school administrator for 30 years. He was also a part-time university instructor for 20 years.

Electoral record

References

External links

Living people
Members of the House of Commons of Canada from Alberta
Conservative Party of Canada MPs
Mayors of places in Alberta
People from Brooks, Alberta
1948 births
Alberta municipal councillors
Canadian educators
21st-century Canadian politicians